Crioceras is a plant genus in the family Apocynaceae first described as a species in 1897. It contains only one known species, Crioceras dipladeniiflorus, native to tropical central Africa (Gabon, Republic of Congo, and the Angolan province of Cabinda).

The type species is Crioceras longiflorus (syn of C. dipladeniiflorus) described by Jean Baptiste Louis Pierre.

References

Flora of Africa
Rauvolfioideae